

See also 
 United States House of Representatives elections, 1788 and 1789
1789 Virginia's 5th congressional district election
 List of United States representatives from Virginia

References 

1789
Virginia
United States House of Representatives